The Indian Reservation Roads Program (IRR) is part of the Bureau of Indian Affairs (BIA) and is meant to meet the transportation needs of American Indians in the United States, American Indian tribes, and Alaska Natives. These roads, also known as BIA Roads are given to tribes by providing funds for planning, designing, construction, and maintenance activities.

The program is jointly administered by the Federal Lands Highway Program and the BIA. These roads are public that provide access to and within Indian reservations, Indian trust land, restricted Indian land, and Alaska native villages. Approximately  are under the jurisdiction of the BIA and tribes and another  are under State and local ownership.

The authorizing legislation is the highway authorization act (currently the Safe, Accountable, Flexible and Efficient Transportation Equity Act – A Legacy for Users (SAFETEA-LU)) and codified in Title 23 U.S.C. and 25 C.F.R. Part 170.

The IRR program funds can be used for any type of Title 23 transportation project providing access to or within Federal or Indian lands and may be used for the State/local matching share for apportioned Federal-aid Highway Funds.

List of roads

See also

External links
Federal Highway Administration Home Page
Indian Reservation Roads Inventory

References

This article incorporates public domain material from dot.gov

United States Bureau of Indian Affairs
Federal Highway Administration